WKS Czarni Radom, officially known for sponsorship reasons as Cerrad Enea Czarni Radom, is a professional men's volleyball team based in Radom in central Poland. Founded in 1921 as a football club, the club had many sections in the past, however since 1997 only the volleyball section has remained.

Czarni Radom team won the Polish Cup in 1999 and two Polish Championship bronze medals in 1994 and 1995. The club ceased to exist in 2003 and was reactivated in 2007. In 2013, after 11 years of absence, the team was finally promoted to PlusLiga.

Honours 
 Polish Cup
Winners (1): 1998–99

Team history 

Founding of the club took place in 1921 after the split in the football team "Kordian" belonging to Radomskie Towarzystwo Sportowe (Radom Sports Association). Some athletes left from the structure of the association to form a club Czarni Radom. 2 years later the club, gaining more and more sympathy of the 72nd Infantry Regiment stationed in Radom transformed into a Military Sports Club – Wojskowy Klub Sportowy "Czarni". Initially, its work was confined only to the football section. Over time, the club has expanded its structure. However, bringing a volleyball section to life was achieved later and underwent various difficulties.

In 1957, the club's management has decided to create a men's volleyball section. A team that was based on cadets of the Żwirko and Wigura Military Aviation School in Radom started in league one season later. The team took second place in the championship and has withdrawn from the competition.

In 1979 a team led by coach Jan Skorżyński was promoted to the second level league. Historical success was achieved by the team based on its own pupils, Radom high school students and a few soldiers doing military service in Radom. The team consisted of: Andrzej Skorupa, Tomasz Gałczyński, Ryszard Laskowski, Ryszard Pisarek, Jarosław Trochimiuk, Zbigniew Janikowski, Witold Poinc, Janusz Tomaszewski, Robert Mach, Jacek Gagacki, Roman Murdza and Ryszard Kotala.

In 1984 Czarni Radom team achieved historical promotion to the Ekstraklasa, in which played continuously for eighteen seasons. In 1994, coached by Valery Jarużnyj, they won the first ever bronze medal of Polish championship. The success repeated a year later and then the coach of the team was Jacek Skrok.

On 26 September 1997, the whole club was transformed into a volleyball club and changed its name to Warka Strong Club WKS Czarni Radom. In 1999 Czarni Radom players witch coach Edward Skorek won Polish Cup. In season 1999/2000 they played in CEV Cup Winners' Cup.

On 14 April 2002 Czarni Radom team for the first time in its history was relegated to Polish second league. One year later, the club ceased to exist.

In 2007 the club was recreated. In the 2011–12 season, Czarni Radom players, coached by Wojciech Stępień were finally promoted to the I liga (second level league) and in the next season to PlusLiga.

The first steps to create a Czarni Radom fan club supporters started at the beginning of 1999. In 2003–07, there were supporters without a club. They were conflicted with Jadar Radom because the club did not continue the history and tradition of Czarni Radom that had gone bankrupt. Since 2005 they were not allowed to watch any match of Jadar. This caused conflict among the "new" Jadar fans and the "old" Czarni fans who wanted Jadar to continue the legacy of the dissolved Czarni club. In the end due to the conflict Czarni started attending the reserve Jadar matches and then reformed the original club in 2007 on the basis of them.

Team 
As of 2022–23 season

Coaching staff

Players

See also

Squads

2019/2020 
The following is the Cerrad Enea Czarni Radom roster in the 2019–20 PlusLiga.

1 Michał Filip left the team on 30 January 2020 and joined BKS Visła Bydgoszcz. He was replaced by Łukasz Zugaj.

2018/2019 
The following is the Cerrad Czarni Radom roster in the 2018–19 PlusLiga.

2017/2018 
The following is the Cerrad Czarni Radom roster in the 2017–18 PlusLiga.

2016/2017 
The following is the Cerrad Czarni Radom roster in the 2016–17 PlusLiga.

2015/2016 
The following is the Cerrad Czarni Radom roster in the 2015–16 PlusLiga.

2014/2015 
The following is the Cerrad Czarni Radom roster in the 2014–15 PlusLiga.

2013/2014 
The following is the Cerrad Czarni Radom roster in the 2013–14 PlusLiga.

References

External links 
 Official website
 Team profile at PlusLiga.pl
 Team profile at Volleybox.net

Polish volleyball clubs
Sport in Radom